Adhisaya Manithan is a 1990 Indian Tamil-language science fiction slasher film, produced by Thakkali Srinivasan and directed by Velu Prabhakaran. It is a sequel to Naalai Manithan (1989). The film stars Gautami in the lead role, among others. It was released on 6 July 1990.

Plot 

Gautami and her friends come to a deserted mansion and slowly encounter horror in the form of the devil man who would come alive and kill one by one until Gautami escapes from the devil.

Cast 
Nizhalgal Ravi as Police Inspector
Ajay Rathnam as Mysterious Human
Gautami as Ganga
Chitra as Kousalya
Kovai Sarala as Urmila
Chinni Jayanth as Majunu
Kapil Dev as Gupta
Kuyili as Lynda
Anand as Lynda's Boyfriend
Raja as Ramani
Silk Smitha as Nancy
Radha Ravi (Guest Appearance)
Charan Raj as Scientist (Guest Appearance)
Kitty as Sebastian
V. Gopalakrishnan as Police Chief

Soundtrack 
The soundtrack was composed by Premi–Srini and lyrics were written by Muthubharathi.

Reception 
C. R. K. of Kalki wrote that if fear is the only objective, then the filmmakers succeeded in it.

References

External links 

1990 films
1990 science fiction films
1990s slasher films
1990s Tamil-language films
Films directed by Velu Prabhakaran
Indian science fiction films
Indian sequel films
Indian slasher films